Mississippi Highway 587 (MS 587) is a state highway in Mississippi. MS 587 serves the counties of Lawrence and Marion.

History
MS 587 first appeared in maps in 1956, from US 98 to US 84. The majority of the section in Marion County was paved in hard surfacing, with the rest in gravel. The route north of Morgantown was removed from the map in 1967, and was added back in 1984, but not state maintained. It became state maintained by 1998.

Major intersections

References

External links

587
Transportation in Marion County, Mississippi
Transportation in Lawrence County, Mississippi